Year 1284 (MCCLXXXIV) was a leap year starting on Saturday (link will display the full calendar) of the Julian calendar.

Events 
 By place 

 Europe 
 Aragonese Crusade: The first French armies under King Philip III ( the Bold) and his 14-year-old son Charles of Valois enter Roussillon. They include 16,000 cavalry, 17,000 crossbowmen, and 100,000 infantry, along with 100 ships in south French ports. Though they have the support of James II, ruler of Majorca, the local populace rises against them. Elne is valiantly defended by Aragonese troops, but the French occupy the city, and burn the cathedral, while the population is massacred. 
 April 4 – King Alfonso X (the Wise) falls ill and dies after a 32-year reign at Seville. He is succeeded by his 25-year-old son Sancho IV ( the Brave) who becomes ruler of Castile and León. Meanwhile, his nephew, Alfonso de la Cerda, challenges his right to the Castilian throne. Pope Martin IV excommunicates Sancho, he placed an interdict on his kingdom and refuses to acknowledge the marriage to his cousin, Queen María de Molina.
 June 5 – Battle of the Gulf of Naples: An Aragonese-Sicilian fleet (some 30 galleys) led by Admiral Roger of Lauria surrounds and defeats the Neapolitan ships in the Gulf of Naples. King Charles II (the Lame) is captured during the battle, disorganized, the remnants of the Neapolitan fleet (between 15 and 18 galleys) flees back to Naples. 
 August 5–6 – Battle of Meloria: A Genoese fleet (some 90 galleys) led by Admiral Oberto D'Oria defeats the Pisan ships in the Ligurian Sea. This marks the decline of the maritime power of Pisa in the Mediterranean.
 King Rudolf I imposes a trade embargo on Norway, due to the latter pillaging a German ship. The embargo cuts off vital supplies of grain, flour, vegetables and beer, causing a general famine in Norway.
 The events giving rise to the story of the Pied Piper of Hamelin take place in Lower Saxony.

 England 
 March 3 – Statute of Rhuddlan: King Edward I (Longshanks) brings Wales under direct rule after the Welsh Wars (1277–1283). He appoints sheriffs and bailiffs for the northern territories while the southern areas are left under the control of the Marcher Lords. English law is introduced in criminal cases, though the Welsh are allowed to maintain their customary laws in some cases of property disputes.Carpenter, David (2004). The Struggle for Mastery: Britain, 1066–1284, p. 511. London, UK: Penguin Books. . 
 Edward I (Longshanks) arranges a Round Table event and tournament at Nefyn in Wales. He promises the Welsh that he will provide them with a Prince of Wales.

 Africa 
 Hafsid forces under Abu Hafs Umar I (half-brother of Abu Ishaq Ibrahim I) reconquer Tunis and reinstall the Hafsid Dynasty as the dominating power in Ifriqiya. This ends the Bedouin rebellion (see 1283) started last year.
 King Peter III (the Great) takes advantage of the weakness of the Hafsid Dynasty and raids the island of Djerba. Aragonese forces massacre the population and occupy the island.

 By topic 

 Art and Culture 
 Construction of Beauvais Cathedral is interrupted by a partial collapse of the choir; the event unnerves French masons working in the Gothic style.
 Jean de Meun, French poet and writer, translates Vegetius' 4th century military treatise De Re Militari from Latin into French.

 Cities and Towns 
 May 18 – Jönköping in Sweden is granted town privileges by King Magnus III.

 Education 
 Peterhouse, oldest collegiate foundation of the University of Cambridge in England, is established by Bishop Hugh de Balsham.

 Health 
 The Al-Mansuri bimaristan (hospital) is completed in Cairo.

 Markets 
 The Republic of Venice begins coining the ducat, a gold coin that is to become the standard of European coinage, for the following 600 years.

Births 
 April 25 – Edward II (Caernarfon), king of England (d. 1327)
 April 26 – Alice de Toeni, English noblewoman (d. 1325)
 Delphine of Glandèves, French noblewoman (d. 1358)
 Edward (the Liberal), Savoyan nobleman (d. 1329)
 John I, Dutch nobleman (House of Holland) (d. 1299)
 Piers Gaveston, English nobleman and knight (d. 1312)
 Thomas de Brus, Scottish nobleman and knight (d. 1307)
 Wernher von Homberg, Swiss knight and poet (d. 1320)
 Yu Qin, Chinese official, geographer and writer (d. 1333)

Deaths 
 January 18 – Qonqurtai, Mongol nobleman and viceroy
 January 28 – Alexander, Scottish prince and heir (b. 1264)
 February 12 – Humphrey of Montfort, Outremer nobleman 
 March 24 – Hugh III (the Great), king of Cyprus (b. 1235)
 April 4 – Alfonso X (the Wise), king of Castile (b. 1221)
 April 6 – Peter I, French nobleman and prince (b. 1251)
 April 9 – Adelaide of Holland, Dutch noblewoman (b. 1230)
 April 15 – Jordan of Osnabrück, German political writer
 April 20 – Hōjō Tokimune, Japanese nobleman (b. 1251)
 July 30 – Sturla Þórðarson, Icelandic chieftain (b. 1214)
 August 9 – James of Castile, son of Alfonso X (b. 1268)
 August 10 – Tekuder, Mongol ruler of the Ilkhanate (b. 1246)
 August 19 – Alphonso, English nobleman and heir (b. 1273)
 August 30 – Ichijō Sanetsune, Japanese nobleman (b. 1223)
 October 16 – Shams al-Din Juvayni, Persian ruler and vizier
 November 9 – Siger of Brabant, Dutch philosopher (b. 1240)
 Al-Mansur II Muhammad, Ayyubid ruler of Hama (b. 1214)
 Ibn Kammuna, Arab Jewish philosopher and writer (b. 1215)
 Irene Komnene Palaiologina, Byzantine princess (b. 1218)
 Isa ibn Muhanna, Mamluk ruler, commander and prince  
 John de Derlington, English archbishop and theologian
 Kaykhusraw III, Seljuk ruler of the Sultanate of Rum

References